Yok Siam was a Thai quiz show television program. It encouraged Thai people in each province using their ability joyfully about knowledges and being proud in their hometown. It broadcast on Monday - Friday 6:01 - 6:30 p.m. on Modern Nine TV. It had begun airdate on February 18, 2008 before ended on February 28, 2011. Yok Siam was produced by Workpoint Entertainment.

In addition, Maha Vajiralongkorn, Crown Prince of Thailand gave certificates with his signature to the province that is the winner.

Seasons 
 Yok Siam Year 1 (February 18, 2008 - January 9, 2009) Winner of each group: Prachinburi, Sisaket, Yasothon, Nakhon Ratchasima, Phetchaburi, Ang Thong, Chanthaburi, Nong Khai, Chiang Rai, Kanchanaburi, Nonthaburi, Yala, Samut Prakan, Sukhothai, Mae Hong Son, Ranong, Chumphon. The champion was Ranong.
 Yok Siam Year 2 (January 12, 2009 - February 3, 2010) Winner and runner-up of each region: Trat, Chanthaburi, Chiang Rai, Sukhothai, Phatthalung, Songkhla, Khon Kaen, Nakhon Ratchasima, Nonthaburi, Nakhon Nayok. The champion was Nonthaburi.
 Yok Siam 100 (March 1 - June 2, 2010)
 Yok Siam 10 (June 3, 2010 - February 28, 2011)

References 

 
Y
Y
Y
Y
2000s Thai television series
2010s Thai television series
MCOT HD original programming